is a town located in Amakusa District, Kumamoto Prefecture, Japan.

, the town has an estimated population of 7,462 and a density of 110 persons per km². The total area is 67.06 km².

Reihoku is home to the Kyushudenryoku Reihoku Power Station, a 1,400-megawatt coal-fired power station.

References

External links

Reihoku official website 

Towns in Kumamoto Prefecture